Adoneta spinuloides, the purple-crested slug moth, is a species of slug caterpillar moth in the family Limacodidae.

The MONA or Hodges number for Adoneta spinuloides is 4685.

References

Further reading

External links

 

Limacodidae
Articles created by Qbugbot
Moths described in 1854